Meteksan Savunma is a Turkish defense technology company based in Ankara, specializing in radar systems, perimeter surveillance systems, laser and electro-optic systems, communication systems, underwater acoustic systems and simulators. It is part of Bilkent Holding, a large conglomerate funded by Bilkent University, which is Turkey's 15th largest industrial group, and privately held.

Meteksan is one of the suppliers of the Turkish Armed Forces, and has been involved in projects such as missile defense systems, attack helicopters, UAVs, corvettes and underwater weapons systems.

History
Meteksan Defence is established in 2006 as a subsidiary of Bilkent Holding and Bilkent University. The company's first contract was Army Operational Training Center Project. Then "Millimeter Wave Radar Techniques for Land Target Acquisition" and "Naval Warfare Simulation System" projects were awarded through TUBITAK funds.

In 2009, it was designated as a "Center of Excellence in Underwater Acoustics" by Turkey's Undersecretariat for Defense Industries, the first such center established as part of a Turkish government initiative to increase the output of its local defense industries. Since 2010 Meteksan launched a product oriented strategy within the defense electronics and has become one of the fastest growing private-sector companies of defense industry in Turkey.

Meteksan demonstrates a performance higher than international industry benchmark, and reveals more than 250,000 USD revenue per employee. The company operates a successful network of suppliers and SMEs; maximizes direct personnel efficiency ratio to its highest in Turkish defense industry, while minimizing overhead to total expense ratio.

Products

 MILDAR Fire Control Radar
 MILSAR UAV SAR/GMTI Radar
 Retinar Perimeter Surveillance Radar Family
 KAPAN Anti-Drone System
 OKIS Automatic Take-off and Landing System
 Radar Altimeters
 Data Links for Missile Systems
 C-Band UAV Data Link System
 YAKAMOS 2020 Hull Mounted Sonar System
 Underwater Early Warning Sensor Networks
 Damage Control Simulator
 Fire Training Simulator
 Retinar FAR-AD Drone Detection Radar 
 Helicopter Underwater Escape Training (HUET) Simulator
 ULAQ Armed Unmanned Surface Vehicle

References

Companies established in 2006
Defence companies of Turkey
Manufacturing companies based in Ankara